The list of symphonies in B-flat minor includes:

Havergal Brian
Symphony No. 8 (1949)
Frederic Hymen Cowen
Symphony No. 4
Jānis Ivanovs
Symphony No. 1 (1933)
Dmitry Kabalevsky
, Op. 22 "Rekviem" (text by Aseev) (1933)
Miloslav Kabeláč
Symphony No. 5 Dramatic, Op. 41 (1960)
Edgar Stillman Kelley
Symphony "New England", op. 33 (premiered 1913)
Tikhon Khrennikov
Symphony No. 1, Op. 4 (1933-5)
Sergei Lyapunov
Symphony No. 2, Op. 66
Albéric Magnard
, op. 11 (1896)
Nikolai Myaskovsky
Symphony No. 11, Op. 34 (1932)
Symphony No. 13, Op. 36 (1933)
Ottorino Respighi
Sinfonia drammatica (1914-15), P.102 
Harald Sæverud
Symphony No. 3, Op. 5
Dmitri Shostakovich
Symphony No. 13 "Babi Yar", Op. 113 (1962)
Maximilian Steinberg
Symphony No. 2, Op. 8 (1909) In Memoriam Rimsky-Korsakov
Alexander Taneyev
 (1902)
William Walton
Symphony No. 1 (1932–35)

See also
List of symphonies by key

References

B flat minor
Symphonies